Qalatiyah (also spelled Qlltia, Kilitia, or Kulleituliyeh) is a village in western Syria located close to the Lebanese border in the Wadi al-Nasara ("Valley of the Christians") and administratively belonging to the governorate of Homs. According to the Syria Central Bureau of Statistics, Qalatiyah had a population of 724 in the 2004 census.

Its inhabitants are predominantly Greek Orthodox Christians. The majority of its population comes originally from Lebanon's northern Christian villages. Their migration began in the mid-19th century as a result of the Mount Lebanon civil war in 1860. The village has a Greek Orthodox Church.

References

Bibliography

 

Populated places in Talkalakh District
Eastern Orthodox Christian communities in Syria
Christian communities in Syria